Line 600 is one of CFR's main lines in Romania having a total length of . The main line, connecting Făurei (on the line from Bucharest to Galați) with the Moldovan border near Ungheni, passes through Tecuci, Bârlad, Vaslui, and Iași.

Main and secondary  lines
*

References

Railway lines in Romania
Standard gauge railways in Romania